František Čermák and Filip Polášek were the defending champions but decided not to participate.
Marcel Granollers and Marc López won the title by beating Robert Farah and Santiago Giraldo 6–4, 7–6 in the final.

Seeds

Draw

Draw

References
 Main Draw

Credit Agricole Suisse Open Gstaad - Doubles
2012 Doubles
2012 Crédit Agricole Suisse Open Gstaad